John Andrew La Nauze (9 June 1911 – 20 August 1990) was an Australian historian from Western Australia. 

He was born in the Goldfields town of Boulder. Shortly after his fourth birthday, his Mauritian-born father Captain Charles La Nauze was killed by Turkish artillery fire at Silt Spur (southern ANZAC sector) Gallipoli. His mother moved the family to Perth where he attended South Perth Primary School and Perth Modern School. He completed degrees in Arts at the University of Western Australia and (as Rhodes Scholar for 1931) at Balliol College, Oxford before joining the Economics Departments at Adelaide (from 1935) and Sydney (1940-49). 

In 1950 La Nauze became Foundation Professor of Economic History in the University of Melbourne, moving to the newly created Ernest Scott Chair in the Department of History in 1956. In 1966 he succeeded Sir Keith Hancock as Professor of History in the Institute of Advanced Studies at the Australian National University. On his retirement in 1977 he became the first Professor of Australian Studies at Harvard in 1978. In the Melbourne History Department he introduced courses in Later British History – which he believed essential to an understanding of Australian History — and fostered research in both fields.

Publications
Political Economy in Australia (1949), 
Alfred Deakin (1962) 
The Hopetoun Blunder (1957)
Federated Australia. Selections From Letters to the Morning Post 1900-1910. Deakin, Alfred. 1968 (Edited with introduction by)
The Making of the Australian Constitution (1972)
Walter Murdoch (1977)

References
 Notable Historians. University of Melbourne
 La Nauze, John (1911–1990). Obituaries Australia
Edward Duyker & Pauline McGregor Currien, 'La Nauze, Charles Andrew (1882-1915)’, Dictionnaire de Biographie Mauricienne, no. 58, décembre 2006, pp. 2032–5.
 Australian Dictionary of Biography

1911 births
1990 deaths
Alumni of Balliol College, Oxford
Australian Rhodes Scholars
Harvard University faculty
People educated at Perth Modern School
Academic staff of the University of Adelaide
University of Western Australia alumni
Australian people of Mauritian descent
People from Boulder, Western Australia